HMS Alacrity was a schooner of the Royal Navy, built by John Cuthbert, Millers Point, New South Wales as the yacht Ethel that the Royal Navy purchased in 1872.

She was later used for anti-blackbirding operations in the South Pacific and also for hydrographic surveys of Fiji and Australia. On 3 June 1873, Alacrity ran aground in Vita Bay, Fiji Islands. She was refloated. She was paid off in 1882 and sold to the Colony of New South Wales, which converted her to a powder hulk guardship.

Alacrity was in use as an accommodation hulk at Bantry Bay during the Second World War.

Citations

References
Bastock, John (1988), Ships on the Australia Station, Child & Associates Publishing Pty Ltd; Frenchs Forest, Australia. 

1872 ships
Ships built in New South Wales
Victorian-era naval ships of the United Kingdom
Maritime incidents in June 1873